Filippo Delli Carri (born 3 May 1999) is an Italian professional footballer who plays as a defender for  club Padova on loan from Como.

Club career

Pescara
He is the product of the youth teams of Pescara, he played for their Under-19 squad in the 2015–16 and 2016–17 seasons. He made several bench appearances for Pescara's senior team in the 2016–17 Serie A, but did not appear on the field. He made his debut for Pescara as a starter and played full 120 minutes in a 2017–18 Coppa Italia 5–3 extra time victory over Triestina on 6 August 2017.

Juventus
On 31 August 2017, he joined Juventus. He played for their under-19 squad in the Campionato Primavera 1 in the 2017–18 season, without any call-ups to the senior squad.

Loan to Rieti
On 1 October 2018, Serie C club Rieti officially announced that Delli Carri joined them on a season-long loan. He made his Serie C debut for them earlier, on 29 September 2018 in a game against Cavese as a last-minute substitute for Thomas Vasiliou.

Juventus U23 
On 1 September 2019, Delli Carri played his first game for Serie C side Juventus U23, the reserve team of Juventus, in a 3–2 defeat against Siena.

Loan to Salernitana
On 31 August 2021, he joined Serie A side Salernitana on a season-long loan. On 11 December he made his Serie A debut for the club in a 4–0 defeat against Fiorentina.

Como
On 5 July 2022, Delli Carri signed a two-year contract with Como. On 10 January 2023, Delli Carri was loaned to Padova for the rest of the season.

Personal life
Delli Carri's father Daniele played in the Serie A for Fiorentina, Siena, Torino, Piacenza and Genoa in the 1990s and 2000s.

Honours 
Juventus U23
 Coppa Italia Serie C: 2019–20

References

External links
 

1999 births
Footballers from Turin
Living people
Italian footballers
Association football defenders
Delfino Pescara 1936 players
F.C. Rieti players
Juventus F.C. players
Juventus Next Gen players
U.S. Salernitana 1919 players
Como 1907 players
Calcio Padova players
Serie A players
Serie C players